The Light-Life Movement, also known as the Oasis Movement, is an organisation within the Catholic Church. The group originated in Poland thanks to the efforts of Franciszek Blachnicki.

History 
The  history of the Movement dates back to the first  retreat, which took place in 1954 with the participation of altar boys. Before 1976 movement was known as "the Oasis Movement", "the Movement of the Living Church", "the Movement of the Immaculate." The creator of the oasis, the founder and first national moderator of the movement was Servant of God Fr. Franciszek Blachnicki (buried in Good Shepherd Church in Krościenko), who died in 1987 in Germany where he worked after the beginning of the martial law in Poland. The Light-Life Movement has been founded and developed in Poland but it has already spread to other countries: Slovakia, the Czech Republic, Germany, Belarus, Latvia, Ukraine, Great Britain, Ireland, Canada, USA, Kenya, China and Pakistan. There are also small groups or communities in Norway, Sweden, Greece, France, Belgium, Luxemburg and Bulgaria. There are no exact figures on the number of members of the Movement.

Programme 
Spirituality of the Light-Life Movement has been expressed in The Guideposts of the New Man. The formation programme is at the heart of the Movement and is based upon the document Rite of Christian Initiation of Adults.

See also 
 Neocatechumenal Way

References

Further reading

External links

Light-Life Movement in Directory of International Associations of the Faithful, published by the Pontifical Council for the Laity.

Christian revivals
Catholic organizations established in the 20th century
Catholic Church in Poland
International associations of the faithful